Burlington Junction is a city in Nodaway County, Missouri, United States. The population was 537 at the 2010 census.

History
Burlington Junction was founded in 1879, and named for a Burlington railroad junction near the original town site.  A post office called Burlington Junction has been in operation since 1879.

Possum Walk Hotel was listed on the National Register of Historic Places in 1983.

Geography
Burlington Junction is located at  (40.446282, -95.066345).

Demographics

2010 census
As of the census of 2010, there were 537 people, 228 households, and 147 families living in the city. The racial makeup of the city was 99.1% White, 0.2% from other races, and 0.7% from two or more races. Hispanic or Latino of any race were 0.9% of the population.

There were 228 households, of which 32.9% had children under the age of 18 living with them, 49.1% were married couples living together, 9.2% had a female householder with no husband present, 6.1% had a male householder with no wife present, and 35.5% were non-families. 31.1% of all households were made up of individuals, and 13.6% had someone living alone who was 65 years of age or older. The average household size was 2.36 and the average family size was 2.96.

The median age in the city was 37.5 years. 26.3% of residents were under the age of 18; 8% were between the ages of 18 and 24; 24.2% were from 25 to 44; 25.5% were from 45 to 64; and 16% were 65 years of age or older. The gender makeup of the city was 50.7% male and 49.3% female.

2000 census
As of the census of 2000, there were 632 people, 254 households, and 170 families living in the city. The racial makeup of the city was 99.68% White and 0.32% Native American. Hispanic or Latino of any race were 0.16% of the population.

There were 254 households, out of which 35.8% had children under the age of 18 living with them, 55.9% were married couples living together, 6.7% had a female householder with no husband present, and 32.7% were non-families. 29.1% of all households were made up of individuals, and 16.5% had someone living alone who was 65 years of age or older. The average household size was 2.46 and the average family size was 3.06.

In the city the population was spread out, with 27.7% under the age of 18, 10.8% from 18 to 24, 25.9% from 25 to 44, 18.8% from 45 to 64, and 16.8% who were 65 years of age or older. The median age was 34 years. For every 100 females there were 92.7 males. For every 100 females age 18 and over, there were 83.5 males.

The median income for a household in the city was $29,722, and the median income for a family was $34,808. Males had a median income of $28,068 versus $18,214 for females. The per capita income for the city was $13,065. About 6.7% of families and 12.0% of the population were below the poverty line, including 10.7% of those under age 18 and 13.2% of those age 65 or over.

Education
West Nodaway R-I School District is the local school district.

References

External links
 City of Burlington Junction
 West Nodaway R-I School District
 Historic maps of Burlington Junction in the Sanborn Maps of Missouri Collection at the University of Missouri

Cities in Nodaway County, Missouri
Cities in Missouri